CRTL may refer to:
 Lycopene beta-cyclase, an enzyme
 Colorado Right to Life, an American anti-abortion group